Ariel Torres Gutierrez (born November 6, 1997) is an American karateka. He won one of the bronze medals in the men's kata event at the 2020 Summer Olympics in Tokyo, Japan. At the 2019 Pan American Games held in Lima, Peru, he won the silver medal in the men's kata event.

He qualified at the World Olympic Qualification Tournament in Paris, France to represent the United States at the 2020 Summer Olympics in Tokyo, Japan.

References

External links 
 
 

1997 births
Living people
Place of birth missing (living people)
American male karateka
Pan American Games medalists in karate
Pan American Games silver medalists for the United States
Medalists at the 2019 Pan American Games
Karateka at the 2019 Pan American Games
Karateka at the 2020 Summer Olympics
Olympic karateka of the United States
Medalists at the 2020 Summer Olympics
Olympic bronze medalists for the United States in karate
20th-century American people
21st-century American people